The Church of the Holy Trinity is a Church of England church in Sliema, Malta which was built to resemble an English village church and opened in 1866.

Origins

The land upon which the church and the adjacent Bishop's house are built was acquired by Jane Trower, the daughter of Walter Trower, Bishop of Gibraltar, for £1050. She intended to donate the property to the Diocese of Europe but the law did not permit an unmarried woman to make a donation exceeding £50. So her father became party to the Deed of Gift and refunded the money back to her. The church architecture is not common in Malta. The church was built to resemble an English village church.

In 1865, Webster Paulson was commissioned as a contractor in the construction of the church, which was built to designs of Gordon MacDonald Hills (1826-1895).

The church was completed in 1866 and opened to the public. It was consecrated on April 23, 1867 by Bishop Walter Trower of Gibraltar.

The Reverend Dr Thomas Burbidge was the first vicar of the church.

Bishop's House
The building adjacent to the church is known as the Bishop's House. It was built in 1855 as a residence for the vicar. Today the house still serves the same purpose.

Further reading

See also

Culture of Malta
History of Malta
List of Churches in Malta
Religion in Malta

References

Website
Holy Trinity Sliema

Churches completed in 1844
19th-century Anglican church buildings
Sliema
Anglican church buildings in Malta
19th-century Church of England church buildings
Gothic Revival church buildings in Malta